.lat is an Internet generic top-level domain (gTLD) for Latin American communities and users wherever they may reside.

NIC México (Manager of the .mx ccTLD) along with eCOM-LAC (Federation of Latin-America and the Caribbean for the Internet and Electronic Commerce) were appointed official sponsors for this campaign. The full proposal was originally supposed to be presented to ICANN during 2008 but was later to be presented by mid-2011.

There were initial communications that presented the idea of this new top-level domain as a regional one but further news detailed the community orientation of the proposal 

Other names that were being considered are .latin and .latino. Similar proposals had already been approved like the Asian gTLD (.asia) and the European Union's ccTLD (.eu).

It was approved in 2015. 

The domain was acquired by XYZ LLC in late 2022.

References

Generic top-level domains
Latin American culture
2015 introductions